Barmasai is a name of Kenyan origin, meaning "one who killed or captured a Masai. It may refer to:

Bernard Barmasai (born 1974), Kenyan steeplechase runner and former world record holder
David Barmasai Tumo (born 1989), Kenyan marathon runner and winner of the 2011 Dubai Marathon

In Keiyo community Barmasai means 'vow not to go to' (Bar) Maasai Maasai

Kenyan names